Prusias ad Hypium was a city in ancient Bithynia, and afterwards in the late Roman province of Honorias. In the 4th century it became a bishopric that was a suffragan of Claudiopolis in Honoriade. Before its conquest by King Prusias I of Bithynia, it was named Cierus or Kieros. Photius writes that it was called Kieros, after the river which flows by it.

Location

History
The settlement, initially named "Hypios", was later renamed "Kieros". According to Ancient Greek historical writer Memnon of Heraclea (c. 1st century), King Prusias I of Bithynia captured the town of Kieros from the Heracleans, united it to his dominions, and changed its name to "Prusias". Pliny and Ptolemy merely mention it, one placing it at the foot of Mt. Hypius, the other east of the river Hypius. It was an important city on the road between Nicomedia (modern İzmit) at Propontis and Amastris (Amasra) at Euxine in the Pontus region.

In about 74 AD, control of the region, and so of the city, was taken by the Roman Empire. From then on, the city was called "Prusias ad Hypium". The city grew from four to twelve phylai during the Roman period until the 2nd century. Three Roman emperors, Hadrian, Caracalla, and Elagabalus, visited the city in northwestern Asia Minor. Already after the reign of Vespasian, the city became autonomous in internal affairs and minted its own coins, though it remained dependent to Rome in foreign policy. In the beginning of the 5th century, the city became part of the newly established late Roman province of Honorias, and after 451 AD, it lost its wealth towards the end of the Byzantine period.

In 1323, the city was conquered from the Byzantine Empire by Osman Ghazi, the founder of the Ottoman Empire. Osman Ghazi handed over the city's control to his commander Konur Alp Bey. In the Ottoman period, the city center was abandoned, and the settlement was called "Üskübü" from σκοπή (skopi) meaning "watchtower". During the Ottoman period, Islamic culture became prevalent.

With the beginning of the Republican era (after 1923), the town's name was changed to "Konuralp". The name "Üskübü" is still used among the inhabitants.

Archaeology
In the 19th century, travellers passing by the city discovered archaeological fragments. There are official letters preserved in the Ottoman Archives indicating archaeological findings. The transport of a marble sculpture to the Istanbul Archaeology Museums in 1893–94 is mentioned in documents. Documents dated 1903 and 1909 relate to regulations for reuse and to secure archaeological findings until their delivery to the government, respectively.

Scientific archaeological excavations were conducted by the archaeology department of Düzce University under the patronage of the Konuralp Museum and supported by the Municipality of Düzce.

A plan of the city is not known. The archaeological remains and finds suggest that the settlement had a Hellenistic polis character. Main remains are part of the ramparts, a rampart gate, open-air theatre, aqueduct, and a Roman bridge. Some remnants of the ancient city are under the buildings of the modern settlement of vernacular  architecture.

According to inscriptions found at the site, a gymnasium and an agora existed in the ancient city. Their location and plan remain unknown. An inscription states that people contributed money to the construction and repair works of the agora. Another public building in the city, of which the location is not known, is the Domitius bathhouse, mentioned on the honor inscription erected for the son of M. Iulius Cabinius Sacerdos of Prusias. A colonnaded street runs southwest from the Roman bridge. Architectural fragments such as entablatures, arches, pediments, pavements, and drains are found on the site. A bath and aqueduct are from the early Ottoman period.

In 2020, archaeologists discovered a Medusa head dating back to the 1st or 2nd century AD.

City walls and the "Horse Gate"

The ramparts of the city were built suitable to the topography of the terrain. The city walls were built during the Hellenistic and Roman periods in ashlar. Some cut stones were reused in altar and other architectural elements during the repairs in the Byzantine Empire. At the western end of the walls, there is an entrance built with reused block stones.  of the Byzantine city walls are still standing. These walls start right across the ancient bridge located at the edge of the road to Akçakoca, and run as far as Hamam Street. Some of the walls remaining in the gardens of the houses form the foundations of the garden walls. There are also walls dating back to the Ottoman period on the high parts of the slope where the city was founded.

Coins from the time of Roman emperor Gallienus depict the main gate of the city with two towers. This gate is not extant. The "Horse Gate", which stands today within the settlement of Konuralp, and its extension ramparts are monuments of first grade. The city walls were repaired in different periods with reused inscribed materials. The gate lintel is made of local limestone material. It is a reused grave stele with an ancient Greek inscription dedicated to the mother of a Prusiasan and  features a horse relief. The city wall extending in a southeast direction from the gate is connected to a square-plan tower. There is a small gate, formed by reused inscribed stone blocks, on the southern walls.

Theatre

The theatre, which is locally called "The Forty Stairs", was built in the city center during the Hellenistic period (300–30 BC) and was expanded in the Roman period (30 BC-300 AD). The cavea stands on the hillside and is oriented southward. It had a capacity of 10,000 spectators with 36 seating rows in three caveas separated by aisles; only 17 rows in the lower section and 15 rows in the upper section are preserved today. The sides of the seating rows at the radial aisles are decorated with Alchemilla figures.

The scaenae, the theatre stage, has a rectangular plan. Two arched windows and an arched door of the scaenae frons as well as the parodoi stand firmly on the exterior of the stage. The theatre is dated to the period between Hellenistic and Roman since the entrance on the stage is not common in ancient Greek theatre architecture. The cavea was constructed in the 1st century, and the scaenae was added in 190 AD.

Roman bridge

A 74 BC-built -long three-arched bridge is located outside the city walls in the west, crossing the river Hypius (modern-day "Melen" is one of the oldest intact bridges in Turkey built by the Roman Empire). It is made of white marble blocks without using any mortar. The restoration of the bridge, after a flood ruined its pavement, was completed in 2019.

Colonnaded street
A colonnaded street running between the city and the Roman bridge was discovered in 1974 during construction works for an irrigation canal in the southern section of the Düzce-Akçakoca highway D-655. Some architectural elements, such as the architrave, column fragments, vaulted blocks, and arches are deposited in the Konuralp Museum.

Kemerkasım Aqueduct
This is an aqueduct located at the nearby Kemerkasım village. In the beginning of the 2nd century AD, P. Domitius Iulianus helped out financially to bring water to the city, and in the 3rd century a nobleman, Gavinius Sacerdos, financially supported the water system. Eleven retaining legs from the old water system of the city, the Kemerkasım Aqueduct, have survived to the present day. The aqueduct was made of rubble stone.

Necroplis
The necropolis of the ancient city, a large, designed cemetery of Roman period with elaborate tomb monuments, is located on three hills in the Şehit Hüseyin Kıl neighborhood of Konuralp. Artifacts found at this site, such as a garlanded sarcophagus, a Roman period statue, steles, block stones, and earthenware pieces, are exhibited in the Konuralp Museum.

Konuralp Museum
The nearby Konuralp Museum was established in 2003 to preserve the cultural heritage of the ancient city of Prusias ad Hypium. It contains a total of 6,237 artifacts including 1,848 archaeological, 491 ethnographic, and 3,898 coins.

Tyche statue
A statue of Tyche, the presiding tutelary deity, who governed the fortune and prosperity of a city, was uncovered in 1931. The original statue, dated to 4th century AD, is exhibited after restoration in the Istanbul Archaeology Museums, and a copy of it is in the Konuralp Museum.

Floor mosaics
A floor mosaic depicting Orpheus, a legendary musician, poet, and prophet in ancient Greek religion, with the Seasons was unearthed in  the south of the ancient city in 1998. After restoration works, it was placed in the museum.

It depicts Achilles, a hero of the Trojan War, and his mother Thetis.

Garland sarcophagus
A large garlanded sarcophagus was found in the necropolis situated in the hill west of Konuralp in 1937. The long sides of the sarcophagus are decorated with reliefs of garlanded bucrania. Its lower part features reliefs of several animals like pigs, lions, eagles, and fishing birds.

Bishops
The city became a bishopric in the 4th century. Bishop Georgios attended the First Council of Nicaea in 325 AD, and Bishop Olympios took part at the Council of Chalcedon (451 AD).

Several of its bishops are known:
 George (not Hesychius, as Le Quien says), 325 
 Olympios in 451
 Dometius in 681
 Theophilios in 787 
 Constantine in 869 
 Leo in 879
 St. Paul, martyred by the iconoclasts in the ninth century

It is not known when this bishopric disappeared; it still existed in the tenth century.<ref>Heinrich Gelzer, Ungedruckte ... Texte der Notitiæ episcopatuum, 554.</ref> No longer the seat of a residential bishop, it remains a titular see of the Roman Catholic Church.

References

Attribution
 
  The entry cites:
 De Hell, Voyage en Turquie et Perse, IV, 334–38, 353–73
 Texier, Asie Mineure, 85
 Le Bar, Voyage archéologique, 1174–82
 Perrot, Expédition archéologique de la Galatie et de la Bithynie'' (Paris, 1872, 20–42)

External links 
 

Populated places in Bithynia
Former populated places in Turkey
Catholic titular sees in Asia
Bithynian colonies
History of Düzce Province
Ancient Greek archaeological sites in Turkey
Roman sites in Turkey
Tourist attractions in Düzce Province